The Venezuela national Baseball5 team represents Venezuela in international Baseball5 competitions.

History
Venezuela, alongside Cuba, were invited by the World Baseball Softball Confederation to represent WBSC Americas in the 2022 Baseball5 World Cup, held in Mexico City. The Venezuelan team finished fourth after losing to Chinese Taipei 0 matches to 2.

Current roster

Staff

Tournament record

Baseball5 World Cup

References

National baseball5 teams
Baseball5